Marie T. Crowe is a New Zealand psychotherapy academic,  and as of 2019 is a full professor at the University of Otago.

Academic career

After a 1998 PhD titled  'Doing what no normal woman would do'  at the Griffith University, Crowe moved to the University of Otago, rising to full professor in 2012.

Selected works 
 Inder, Maree L., Marie T. Crowe, Stephanie Moor, Suzanne E. Luty, Janet D. Carter, and Peter R. Joyce. "“I actually don't know who I am”: The impact of bipolar disorder on the development of self." Psychiatry: Interpersonal and Biological Processes 71, no. 2 (2008): 123–133.
 Inder, Maree L., Marie T. Crowe, Peter R. Joyce, Stephanie Moor, Janet D. Carter, and Sue E. Luty. "“I really don’t know whether it is still there”: Ambivalent acceptance of a diagnosis of bipolar disorder." Psychiatric Quarterly 81, no. 2 (2010): 157–165.
 Crowe, Marie T., and Jane O'Malley. "Teaching critical reflection skills for advanced mental health nursing practice: A deconstructive–reconstructive approach." Journal of advanced nursing 56, no. 1 (2006): 79–87.
 Inder, Maree L., Marie T. Crowe, Suzanne E. Luty, Janet D. Carter, Stephanie Moor, Christopher M. Frampton, and Peter R. Joyce. "Randomized, controlled trial of Interpersonal and Social Rhythm Therapy for young people with bipolar disorder." Bipolar disorders 17, no. 2 (2015): 128–138.

References

External links
  
 
 
 Health Research Council funding for Crowe

Living people
New Zealand women academics
Year of birth missing (living people)
Griffith University alumni
Academic staff of the University of Otago
New Zealand psychologists
New Zealand women psychologists
New Zealand women writers